Mylène Bouchard (born 1978) is a Canadian writer from Quebec. She is most noted for her 2017 novel L'Imparfaite Amitié, which was a shortlisted nominee for the Governor General's Award for French-language fiction at the 2017 Governor General's Awards.

She has previously published the novels Ma guerre sera avec toi (2006) and La garçonnière (2009), the short story collection Ciel mon mari (2013), and the non-fiction work Faire l'amour : Shakespeare, Tolstoï et Kundera (2014).

References

1978 births
21st-century Canadian novelists
21st-century Canadian short story writers
Canadian women novelists
Canadian women short story writers
Canadian novelists in French
Canadian short story writers in French
Canadian non-fiction writers
People from Saguenay–Lac-Saint-Jean
Writers from Quebec
French Quebecers
Living people
21st-century Canadian women writers
Canadian women non-fiction writers